Everybody Changes is a 2019 Panamanian drama film directed by Arturo Montenegro. It was selected as the Panamanian entry for the Best International Feature Film at the 92nd Academy Awards, but it was not nominated.

Plot
A married father of three comes out as a trans woman.

Cast
 Leonte Bordanea
 Gaby Gnazzo
 Marisín Luzcando
 Andrea Pérez Meana

See also
 List of submissions to the 92nd Academy Awards for Best International Feature Film
 List of Panamanian submissions for the Academy Award for Best International Feature Film

References

External links
 

2019 films
2019 drama films
2019 LGBT-related films
Panamanian drama films
2010s Spanish-language films
Films about trans women
Panamanian LGBT-related films
LGBT-related drama films